Pietro Forquet (2 July 1925 – 27 January 2023) was an Italian bridge player, one of the most famous in bridge history. He won 15 World championship titles with the Blue Team, playing with Eugenio Chiaradia, Guglielmo Siniscalco and, for the most part, Benito Garozzo. Apart from his excellent play, he was renowned for his nerves of steel. 

Forquet and Garozzo wrote a book (1967, in Italian) on the Blue Club bidding system, the 1950s Neapolitan system as modified by their partnership, which was published in English as The Italian Blue Team bridge book (1969). In 1971 he wrote Gioca con il Blue Team, published in English as Bridge with the Blue Team, which is widely considered to be the world's best collection of fascinating bridge deals.

Personal life and death 
Forquet was born in Naples on 2 July 1925. Before becoming a full-time bridge player, he was a bank manager. In the July 1963 issue of Sports Illustrated he was described as "suave, handsome, well-tailored, polite, quick-witted and tough". He died on 27 January 2023, at the age of 97.

Books

 The Italian Blue Team bridge book, Benito Garozzo and Forquet with Enzo Mingoni, 274 pp. (Grosset & Dunlap, 1969) ; (Cassell & Co, 1970) – transl. of Il Fiori Blue Team (Milan: Prati, 1967) 
 Bridge with the Blue Team, translated by Helen Thompson, ed. Ron Klinger, 384 pp. (Sydney: A.B. Publications, 1983) ; (Gollancz, 1987) – transl. of Gioca con il Blue Team. 150 smazzate giocate dal vero (Milan: Ugo Mursia editore, 1971)

A Chinese-language edition of Gioca con il Blue Team was published in 1990, Lan dui qiao pai.

Bridge accomplishments 

World championships
Forquet won 15 world championships, all as one of six players on the Italy open .
 Bermuda Bowl (12) 1957, 1958, 1959, 1961, 1962, 1963, 1965, 1966, 1967, 1969, 1973, 1974
 World Open Team Olympiad (3) 1964, 1968, 1972

Runners-up 
 Bermuda Bowl 1951, 1976
 Olympiad 1976

European championships
 European Open Teams (5) 1951, 1956, 1957, 1958, 1959 

Runners-up: none

References

External links
 
 
 "Pietro Forquet" at BridgeBum (bridgebum.com)
 "Benito Garozzo" at BridgeBum
  (including 1 "from old catalog")

1925 births
2023 deaths
Bermuda Bowl players
Contract bridge writers
Italian contract bridge players
Sportspeople from Naples